Zanigrad is a small settlement in the City Municipality of Koper in the Littoral region of Slovenia.

The local church is dedicated to Saint Stephen and belongs to the Parish of Predloka.

References

External links
Zanigrad on Geopedia

Populated places in the City Municipality of Koper